The 2012 Tuvalu A-Division (also known as the 2012 National Provident Fund Championship League) was the 12th season of top flight association football in Tuvalu. The season began on 4 February 2012 and finished on 17 March 2012.  The champions were Nauti FC who won their seventh league title.

Football in Tuvalu is played at club and national team level. The Tuvalu national football team draws from players in the Tuvalu A-Division; the national team competes in the Pacific Games and South Pacific Games. The national team is controlled by the Tuvalu National Football Association (TNFA).

Clubs

Standings

Round 1

Round 2

1 Tamanuku win by default.

Round 3

Round 4

1 Nauti win by default.

Round 5

1 Manu Laeva win by default.

Round 6

1 Lakena United win by default.

Round 7

1 Nanumaga win by default.

Top goalscorers

Awards

Best Player
The best player for the tournament was Okilani Tinilau of FC Manu Laeva.

References

External links 
 tnfa official website

Tuvalu A-Division seasons
1
Tuvalu